26thAnnie Awards
November 13, 1998

Best Feature Film: 
Mulan

Best Primetime Television Program: 
The Simpsons

Best Daytime Television Program: 
The New Batman/Superman Adventures

Best Home Video Production: 
Batman & Mr. Freeze: SubZero

Best Short Subject: 
Geri's Game

The 26th Annie Awards were given by the International Animated Film Association, ASIFA-Hollywood to honor outstanding achievements in the field of animation in 1998. Mulan almost swept all film awards, winning 10 awards from its 12 nominations, including Outstanding Animated Theatrical Feature. The Simpsons won its seventh consecutive award on Outstanding Animated Television Program.

Production categories 

The Outstanding Animated Television Program was split into two competitive categories: Outstanding Animated Primetime or Late Night Television Program and Outstanding Animated Daytime Television Program. The award Outstanding Animated Television Commercial was awarded for the first time since 21st Annie Awards ceremony.

Winners are listed first, highlighted in bold.

Outstanding individual achievements in Film

Outstanding individual achievements in Television

Juried Awards 

Winsor McCay Award Recognition for career contributions to the art of animation
 Eyvind EarleKnown today for his fine art paintings, Earle worked for the Walt Disney Studios as background artist, color stylist and production designer for such classic films as Lady and the Tramp and Sleeping Beauty and later created art films of his own.
 Hayao Miyazaki One of the world's most influential animation filmmakers, Miyazaki is the director of many Japanese features, including My Neighbor Totoro, Kiki's Delivery Service, and Princess Mononoke, the highest-grossing film ever released in Japan.
 Ernie Pintoff A veteran animation teacher, director and producer of both theatrical shorts (including the Oscar-winning The Critic) and commercials, Pintoff helped to define a new look for animation in the 1950s through his work at UPA and Terrytoons.

June Foray Award Recognition of benevolent/charitable impact on the art and industry of animation
 Antran Manoogian

Certificate of Merit Recognition for service to the art, craft and industry of animation
 Max Howard
 B. Paul Husband
 Media City Center
 Jean Ann Wright

Multiple wins and nominations

The following twenty productions received multiple nominations:

The following three productions received multiple awards:

External links
 
 Annie Awards 1998 at Internet Movie Database

1998
1998 film awards
Annie
Annie